Donna Haliday (born 4 February 1981; née Cranston) is a New Zealand badminton player. In 2008, she won the mixed doubles title at the Oceania Championships in New Caledonia with Henry Tam. She also completed her success by winning the women's and mixed team gold, and making the women's team competed at the 2008 Uber Cup finals in Jakarta. In 2010, she competed at the Delhi Commonwealth Games.

Personal life 
Haliday was born in Raetihi, and raised in Ohakune. Her husband is former national badminton rep Andrew Haliday

Achievements

Oceania Championships 
Women's doubles

Mixed doubles

BWF Grand Prix 
The BWF Grand Prix had two levels, the BWF Grand Prix and Grand Prix Gold. It was a series of badminton tournaments sanctioned by the Badminton World Federation (BWF) which was held from 2007 to 2017.

Mixed doubles

  BWF Grand Prix Gold tournament
  BWF Grand Prix tournament

BWF International Challenge/Series 
Women's doubles

Mixed doubles

  BWF International Challenge tournament
  BWF International Series tournament
  BWF Future Series tournament

References

External links 
 
 

1981 births
Living people
People from Raetihi
New Zealand female badminton players
Badminton players at the 2010 Commonwealth Games
Commonwealth Games competitors for New Zealand